Chicken Boxer is the ninth album by Celtic band Gaelic Storm.  It was released on July 31, 2012.

Track listing 
All arrangements by Gaelic Storm.

 "One More Day Above The Roses" – 3:53
 "Irish Breakfast Day" – 4:31
 "Rag And Bone Intro" – 1:06
 "Rag And Bone" – 3:01
 "Dead Bird Hill" – 3:59
 "My Lucky Day" – 3:45
 "The Bear And The Butcher Boy" – 5:08
 "Whichever Way The Wind Blows" – 4:36
 "Cúnla" – 4:36
 "Out The Road" – 3:56
 "I Can't Find My Way Home" – 3:08
 "Marching Free" – 3:39
 "Stone By Stone" – 3:32
 "Where E're You Go" – 3:53
 "The Storks Of Guadalajara" – 4:07
 "Alligator Arms" – 3:28

Personnel 
Gaelic Storm
 Patrick Murphy – accordion, spoons, bodhrán, lead vocals
 Steve Twigger – guitar, bouzouki, mandolin, bodhrán, lead vocals
 Ryan Lacey – djembe, doumbek, surdo, cajón, vocals, various percussion
 Peter Purvis – Highland bagpipes, Uilleann pipes, Deger pipes, whistle, vocals
 Jessie Burns – fiddle, vocals

Additional Personnel
 Michael Ramos - Accordion
 Eric Thorin - Bass

References 

Gaelic Storm albums
2012 albums